Cotechino Modena or Cotechino di Modena  (spelled cotecchino or coteghino in some major dialects, but not in Italian) is a fresh sausage made from pork, fatback, and pork rind, and comes from Modena, Italy, where it has PGI status.  Zampone Modena is closely related and also has PGI status.

Cotechino dates back to around 1511 to Gavello in Mirandola, where, whilst besieged, the people had to find a way to preserve meat and use the less tender cuts, so they made cotechino. Mirandola developed its own specialty enveloped in a hollowed out pig's trotter, named the Zampone.

By the 18th century it had become more popular than the yellowish sausage that had been around at the time, and in the 19th century entered mass production in and around the area.

Cotechino is often served with lentils alongside mashed potatoes or polenta, especially around New Year.

See also

 List of Italian dishes

References

External links

Cibo360 - Cotechino & Zampone (Italian)

Italian products with protected designation of origin
Italian sausages
Pig's trotters